Caitlin Thwaites (born 29 December 1986) is a former Australian netball player and volleyballer.

Career
Caitlin Thwaites was born in Bendigo, Australia. Thwaites began her career at for the Melbourne Kestrels of the Commonwealth Bank Trophy at the age of 16. However, once the ANZ Championship was founded in 2008 she moved to the Melbourne Vixens. Thwaites played for the Vixens from 2008 to 2010 and was part of the 2009 premiership team which defeated the Adelaide Thunderbirds. In 2011 she joined New Zealand-based ANZ Championship side the Central Pulse. In 2012 Thwaites made her international debut for the Australian Diamonds. Thwaites performed a vital role for the Pulse, scoring 431 goals for an accuracy percentage 81.3 per cent in the 2011 season. Thwaites later became the only New Zealand-based player to be picked for the Australia national team. She returned to Australia to play her domestic league netball in 2014 with the New South Wales Swifts and won the club's MVP award in 2015.

Thwaites began playing for the Collingwood Magpies in the Suncorp Super Netball competition from 2017, where she won the league's leading goalscorer award, scoring 594 goals in the regular season. She was awarded the Magpies' best and fairest for her efforts that year. On 5 September 2018, after not being offered another contract at the Magpies, Thwaites announced she would be signing with the Melbourne Vixens for the 2019 season.

Thwaites has won gold medals representing Australia at the 2014 Commonwealth Games and the 2015 Netball World Cup, as well as a silver medal at the 2018 Commonwealth Games. She was selected in the Australian Diamonds squad for the 2018/19 international season and featured in the Diamonds’ 2019 Netball World Cup squad. She announced her retirement from international netball in October 2019, finishing with 55 caps for the national team. Thwaites was part of the Melbourne Vixens premiership team that won the 2020 Grand Final; she announced her retirement from netball after this match.

Volleyball
Thwaites has also represented Australia in women's volleyball, most notably at the 2004 Olympics qualifications.

Netball career facts
Sources:
 Commonwealth Games Gold Medallist in 2014
 Commonwealth Games Silver Medallist in 2018
 ANZ Championship winner in 2009 (Vixens)
 Member of the Diamonds’ World Cup winning squad in 2015
 Diamonds debut in 2012
 NSW Swifts MVP 2015
 Central Pulse MVP 2011
 Magpies Netball 2017 Best and Fairest
 Magpies Netball 2017 Players' Player
 Magpies Netball vice-captain 2018

References

1986 births
Living people
Australian women's volleyball players
New South Wales Swifts players
Melbourne Vixens players
Collingwood Magpies Netball players
Central Pulse players
Commonwealth Games gold medallists for Australia
Netball players at the 2014 Commonwealth Games
Commonwealth Games medallists in netball
Australia international netball players
Netball players at the 2018 Commonwealth Games
2019 Netball World Cup players
Suncorp Super Netball players
Netball players from Victoria (Australia)
Australia international Fast5 players
Australian expatriate netball people in New Zealand
2015 Netball World Cup players
Medallists at the 2014 Commonwealth Games